Parfyonov, Parfionov or Parfenov (Russian: Парфёнов) is a Russian masculine surname, its feminine counterpart is Parfyonova, Parfionova or Parfenova. The surname originates from the Greek masculine given name Parthenius (Παρθένιος, meaning virgin, pure, clean) and may refer to
 Anatoly Parfyonov (1925–1993), Soviet Greco-Roman wrestler 
 7913 Parfenov, a minor planet named after Anatoly
Andrey Parfenov (born 1987), Russian cross-country skier
 Denis Parfenov (born 1987), Russian politician
 Dmytro Parfenov (born 1974), Ukrainian and Russian football manager and former player
 Leonid Parfyonov (born 1960), Russian television journalist
 Nikolai Parfionov (born 1976), Russian nordic combined athlete
Tatyana Parfenova (born 1985), Kazakhstani handball player 
Vladimir Parfyonov (born 1970), Uzbekistani javelin thrower 
 Zoya Parfenova (1920–1993), Soviet aviator

References

Russian-language surnames